is a train station in the town of Minamichita, Chita District, Aichi Prefecture, Japan, operated by Meitetsu.

Lines
Utsumi Station is a terminal station on the Chita New Line, and is located 13.9 rail kilometers from the opposing terminus at Fuki Station.

Station layout
The station has two elevated island platforms serving four tracks, with the station building located underneath. The station has automated ticket machines, Manaca automated turnstiles and is staffed.

Platforms

Adjacent stations

Station history
Utsumi Station was opened on June 5, 1980. An additional track was added in 1986. In 2007, the Tranpass system of magnetic fare cards with automatic turnstiles was implemented.

Passenger statistics
In fiscal 2018, the station was used by an average of 689 passengers daily.

Surrounding area
Japan National Route 247
Minamichita onsen
Utsumi High School

See also
 List of Railway Stations in Japan

References

External links

 Official web page 

Railway stations in Japan opened in 1976
Railway stations in Aichi Prefecture
Stations of Nagoya Railroad
Minamichita, Aichi